James Williams (born 17 July 1982 in Liverpool) is an English former professional footballer, who last played for Kendal Town.

Williams began his career as a trainee with Swindon Town. He made his debut on 13 April 1999, as a substitute for Kevin Watson as Swindon drew 1–1 away to West Bromwich Albion. He played twice more in the Championship for Swindon that season, a home win against Grimsby Town and a defeat at home to Barnsley on the final day of the season. He played more regularly the following season as Swindon were relegated from the Championship, but played only sporadically the following two seasons due to injury and was released at the end of the 2001–02 season.

He joined Southport in the 2003 close-season, spending two seasons there until his release in June 2005.

He joined Droylsden later that month, and helped them to promotion to the Conference National. However, he played just once in the Conference National, as substitute for Sean Newton in the 2–1 defeat away to Weymouth on 15 April. He joined Kendal Town in August 2008.

References

External links

1982 births
Living people
English footballers
Swindon Town F.C. players
Southport F.C. players
Droylsden F.C. players
Kendal Town F.C. players
Footballers from Liverpool
Association football defenders